Il mio amico Benito (Italian for "My friend Benito") is a 1962 commedia all'italiana film directed by Giorgio Bianchi.

Plot 
Peppino Di Gennaro is a simple clerk who wants to make a career without success. After a friend gave him a photo taken during the First World War that shows him together with Benito Mussolini, he tries to take advantage of it getting an invitation from Duce, but the OVRA stops him every time. After numerous failed attempts he eventually succeeds in entering his office in the exact moment Mussolini was on the balcony announcing the Italian entry into the war; disappointed and embittered, Peppino goes away destroying the photo.

Cast 

 Peppino De Filippo: Giuseppe Di Gennaro
 Didi Perego: Italia
 Mario Carotenuto: Mariani
 Andrea Checchi: Commissioner 
 Emma Gramatica: Giuseppe's Mother 
 Mac Ronay: Landolfi
 Luigi De Filippo: Fioretti
 Carlo Pisacane: Signor Arturo
 Riccardo Billi: Renzi
 Ciccio Barbi: Sor Achille
 Luigi Pavese: Pieroni
 Franco Giacobini: Liberati
 Giuseppe Porelli: Capo divisione
 Franco Franchi: Terrorist 
 Ciccio Ingrassia: Terrorist 
 Tiberio Murgia: Policeman
 Alberto Rabagliati: Himself

References

External links
 

1962 films
Films directed by Giorgio Bianchi
Italian comedy films
1962 comedy films
Commedia all'italiana
Films about fascists
Films set in the 1940s
1960s Italian-language films
1960s Italian films